The House Ways and Means Subcommittee on Oversight is one of the six subcommittees within the House Ways and Means Committee.

Jurisdiction
From the House Rules:

The jurisdiction of the Subcommittee on Oversight shall include all matters within the scope of the full Committee’s jurisdiction but shall be limited to existing law. Said oversight jurisdiction shall not be exclusive but shall be concurrent with that of the other Subcommittees. With respect to matters involving the Internal Revenue Code and other revenue issues, said concurrent jurisdiction shall be shared with the full Committee. Before undertaking any investigation or hearing, the Chairman of the Subcommittee on Oversight shall confer with the Chairman of the full Committee and the Chairman of any other Subcommittee having jurisdiction.

Members, 117th Congress

Historical membership rosters

115th Congress

116th Congress

References

External links
Ways and Means Committee Website: Subcommittee Page

Ways and Means Oversight